The Zimbabwe national under-20 rugby union team is a junior national side. They finished in 7th place at the 2012 IRB Junior World Rugby Trophy.

Squad
Squad to 2012 IRB Junior World Rugby Trophy

Jethro Kanogwere

- Team Manager
Godwin Murambiwa - Assistant Coach
Gary Hewitt - Assistant Coach
Margie Gibson - Physiotherapist
Austin Jeans - Team Doctor

References

External links
 Zimbabwe Rugby

under
National under-20 rugby union teams